Jason Johnson (born 25 January 1978) is a retired Australian rules footballer who spent his entire professional career with Essendon of the Australian Football League (AFL).

Known as a tireless running midfielder, Johnson's career honours include All-Australian selection in 2001, the same year he won the W.S. Crichton Medal for Essendon's best and fairest player.

On 25 August 2008, Johnson and long time teammate Adam Ramanauskas announced their intention to retire from football at the end of the season.

Johnson now sits on the AFL Tribunal jury, adjudicating high-profile cases that arise during the regular season.

Playing statistics

|- style="background-color: #EAEAEA"
! scope="row" style="text-align:center" | 1997
|style="text-align:center;"|
| 42 || 3 || 0 || 2 || 17 || 13 || 30 || 1 || 3 || 0.0 || 0.7 || 5.7 || 4.3 || 10.0 || 0.3 || 1.0
|-
! scope="row" style="text-align:center" | 1998
|style="text-align:center;"|
| 42 || 8 || 2 || 0 || 55 || 29 || 84 || 22 || 9 || 0.3 || 0.0 || 6.9 || 3.6 || 10.5 || 2.8 || 1.1
|- style="background:#eaeaea;"
! scope="row" style="text-align:center" | 1999
|style="text-align:center;"|
| 14 || 4 || 0 || 1 || 22 || 11 || 33 || 5 || 2 || 0.0 || 0.3 || 5.5 || 2.8 || 8.3 || 1.3 || 0.5
|-
! scope="row" style="text-align:center" | 2000
|style="text-align:center;"|
| 14 || 25 || 14 || 20 || 317 || 151 || 468 || 79 || 53 || 0.6 || 0.8 || 12.7 || 6.0 || 18.7 || 3.2 || 2.1
|- style="background:#eaeaea;"
! scope="row" style="text-align:center" | 2001
|style="text-align:center;"|
| 14 || 24 || 21 || 19 || 364 || 162 || 526 || 85 || 64 || 0.9 || 0.8 || 15.2 || 6.8 || 21.9 || 3.5 || 2.7
|-
! scope="row" style="text-align:center" | 2002
|style="text-align:center;"|
| 14 || 24 || 14 || 15 || 324 || 196 || 520 || 95 || 86 || 0.6 || 0.6 || 13.5 || 8.2 || 21.7 || 4.0 || 3.6
|- style="background:#eaeaea;"
! scope="row" style="text-align:center" | 2003
|style="text-align:center;"|
| 14 || 22 || 15 || 13 || 315 || 159 || 474 || 105 || 50 || 0.7 || 0.6 || 14.3 || 7.2 || 21.5 || 4.8 || 2.3
|-
! scope="row" style="text-align:center" | 2004
|style="text-align:center;"|
| 14 || 19 || 14 || 16 || 277 || 173 || 450 || 91 || 57 || 0.7 || 0.8 || 14.6 || 9.1 || 23.7 || 4.8 || 3.0
|- style="background:#eaeaea;"
! scope="row" style="text-align:center" | 2005
|style="text-align:center;"|
| 14 || 22 || 12 || 11 || 308 || 183 || 491 || 120 || 80 || 0.5 || 0.5 || 14.0 || 8.3 || 22.3 || 5.5 || 3.6
|-
! scope="row" style="text-align:center" | 2006
|style="text-align:center;"|
| 14 || 19 || 12 || 7 || 237 || 173 || 410 || 111 || 47 || 0.6 || 0.4 || 12.5 || 9.1 || 21.6 || 5.8 || 2.5
|- style="background:#eaeaea;"
! scope="row" style="text-align:center" | 2007
|style="text-align:center;"|
| 14 || 10 || 3 || 6 || 119 || 88 || 207 || 64 || 30 || 0.3 || 0.6 || 11.9 || 8.8 || 20.7 || 6.4 || 3.0
|-
! scope="row" style="text-align:center" | 2008
|style="text-align:center;"|
| 14 || 4 || 2 || 0 || 44 || 47 || 91 || 22 || 9 || 0.5 || 0.0 || 11.0 || 11.8 || 22.8 || 5.5 || 2.3
|- class="sortbottom"
! colspan=3| Career
! 184
! 109
! 110
! 2399
! 1385
! 3784
! 800
! 490
! 0.6
! 0.6
! 13.0
! 7.5
! 20.6
! 4.3
! 2.7
|}

References

External links

1978 births
Living people
Australian rules footballers from Victoria (Australia)
Essendon Football Club players
Essendon Football Club Premiership players
All-Australians (AFL)
Crichton Medal winners
Calder Cannons players
Australia international rules football team players
One-time VFL/AFL Premiership players